Cory Lekkerkerker (born July 25, 1981) is a former American football offensive tackle. He was signed by the San Diego Chargers as an undrafted free agent in 2005. He played college football at UC Davis.

Lekkerkerker appeared in 26 NFL games as a member of the San Diego Chargers and Miami Dolphins in 2006 and 2007.

Lekkerkerker was also a member of the Dallas Cowboys, Tennessee Titans, California Redwoods, and Sacramento Mountain Lions. He is the younger brother of former Oakland Raiders offensive lineman Brad Lekkerkerker.

Early years
Lekkerkerker played at Damien High School in La Verne, California.

Professional career
In June 2009, Lekkerkerker was drafted to the California Redwoods in the first United Football League draft, but was signed by the Tennessee Titans of the National Football League before reaching a contract with the Redwoods. He was waived by the Titans on September 4, 2009.

References

External links
Just Sports Stats
United Football League bio

1981 births
Living people
Players of American football from California
American football offensive tackles
American football offensive guards
UC Davis Aggies football players
San Diego Chargers players
Sportspeople from San Bernardino County, California
Miami Dolphins players
People from Upland, California
Dallas Cowboys players
Tennessee Titans players
Sacramento Mountain Lions players